John Watterworth (November 24, 1827 – March 1, 1903) was an Ontario political figure. He represented Middlesex West in the Legislative Assembly of Ontario as a Liberal member from 1872 to 1883.

He was born in Elgin County, Ontario. He served as reeve of Mosa Township and warden for Middlesex County. He was elected to the provincial legislature in an 1872 by-election when the sitting member resigned to retain his seat in the federal parliament.

External links 

The Canadian parliamentary companion, 1881. CH Mackintosh

1827 births
1903 deaths
Ontario Liberal Party MPPs